Rhomphaea projiciens is a species of cobweb spider in the family Theridiidae. It is found in a range from the United States to Argentina, and has been introduced into India.

References

Theridiidae
Articles created by Qbugbot
Spiders described in 1896